Akeem Saunders (born 17 June 1994) is a cricketer from Saint Kitts. He made his first-class debut for the Leeward Islands in the 2012–13 Regional Four Day Competition on 6 March 2013. In December 2017, he scored his maiden first-class century, batting for the Leeward Islands against Guyana in the 2017–18 Regional Four Day Competition.

References

External links
 

1994 births
Living people
Kittitian cricketers
Leeward Islands cricketers
Place of birth missing (living people)